Hitomi Takahashi may refer to:

, Japanese actress
, Japanese singer